Haji Mammad oghlu Mammadov (April 28, 1920 — August 2, 1981) was an Azerbaijani tar player and People's Artist of the Azerbaijani SSR.

Biography 
Haji Mammadov was born on April 28, 1920 in Shamakhi. He studied at Azerbaijan State Medical Institute in 1943–1948. In 1949–1970 he worked as a doctor-surgeon. In 1930–1948 he worked in Azerbaijan State Orchestra of Folk Instruments, from 1949 he was a soloist of Azerbaijan State Philharmonic Hall.

Haji Mammadov was one of the first performers of works of classical Russian and Western European composers on tar. He accompanied singers such as Bulbul, Seyid Shushinski, Zulfu Adigozalov, and toured in many foreign countries including Belgium, Poland, Hungary, Iran, Syria and Algeria.

Mammadov died on August 2, 1981 in Baku.

Awards 
 People's Artist of the Azerbaijan SSR - May 18, 1963
 Honored Artist of the Azerbaijan SSR
 Order of the Badge of Honour - June 9, 1959

References

Literature 
 
 

1920 births
1981 deaths
Azerbaijani musicians
Soviet people